Osgood Philip Villiers "Pedro" Hanbury,  (13 September 1917 – 3 June 1943) was a Royal Air Force flying ace of the Second World War. He had scored 11 victories before he was killed in action in 1943.

Early life
Hanbury was the son of Major Philip Hanbury and Dorothy Maud Margary. He was educated at Eton College and after training received a short service commission in the Royal Air Force (RAF) on 30 June 1940.

Second World War
Hanbury initially served as a Westland Lysander pilot, carrying out liaison duties in the British Isles. On 3 September 1940, during the Battle of Britain, Hanbury volunteered to transfer to Fighter Command and was posted to No. 602 Squadron RAF. He soon scored several victories in aerial battles over the English Channel and southern England flying X4382, a late production Supermarine Spitfire Mk I. By the end of 1940 he had four confirmed victories.

In May 1941 he was transferred to No. 260 Squadron RAF, based in the Middle East and North Africa, and operated Curtiss P-40 Warhawks. On 22 May 1942 he was awarded the Distinguished Flying Cross (DFC) after leading a defensive operation against an enemy air raid on Tobruk.  On 23 June 1942 Hanbury became commanding officer of the squadron and was promoted to flight officer. On 28 July 1942 he received a Bar to his DFC for his leadership of No. 260 Squadron and his actions against the enemy. On 20 April 1943 he was awarded the Distinguished Service Order.

Hanbury was killed on 3 June 1943 while travelling as a passenger on a Lockheed Hudson of No. 117 Squadron RAF piloted by Robert Yaxley, which was shot down by a German aircraft over the Bay of Biscay. He had scored a total of 11 confirmed victories at the time of his death.

Personal life

Eleven days before his death, Hanbury had married Patricia Cecil Harman, daughter of Charles Cecil Harman and Muriel Kathleen Marion Huth, on 22 May 1943. She gave birth to their son, Christopher Osgood Philip Hanbury, on 16 February 1944.

He is commemorated on the Air Forces Memorial. A biography about his war time experiences, Pedro: The life and death of Osgood Villiers Hanbury, DFC and Bar by  Robin Rhoderick-Jones, was published in 2010.

Citations

References

1917 births
1943 deaths
Aviators killed by being shot down
British World War II flying aces
Royal Air Force personnel killed in World War II
Companions of the Distinguished Service Order
People educated at Eton College
Recipients of the Distinguished Flying Cross (United Kingdom)
Royal Air Force squadron leaders
Royal Air Force Volunteer Reserve personnel of World War II
The Few
Royal Air Force pilots of World War II